Earl I. Anzai (Family Name 安斎　October 4, 1941) served as Attorney General of Hawaii from 1999 to 2002, appointed by Governor of Hawaii Benjamin J. Cayetano. A career Democrat, Anzai also served as state budget director from 1995 to 1999 and Office of Hawaiian Affairs special counsel from 1990 to 1994. From 1968 to 1970, he worked for the federal government in the United States Government Accountability Office. He was admitted to the Hawaii State Bar in October 1981.

Education
Earl Anzai was raised in Hawaii. Anzai graduated from Kahuku High School in rural City & County of Honolulu. He left the islands to study at Emory University and then Oregon State University before successfully obtaining a Bachelor of Arts degree in economics from the University of Hawaiʻi at Mānoa in 1964. In 1966, he obtained a master of arts degree in the same field at the same school. From 1966 to 1968, Anzai received a Ph.D. education but transferred to the William S. Richardson School of Law at the University of Hawaiʻi at Mānoa, where he obtained a doctorate of jurisprudence instead in 1981.

On May 16, 2008, Anzai was finally initiated as a member of the Beta Chi chapter of the Sigma Chi fraternity at Emory University in Atlanta, Georgia. He is also a 1976 alumnus of the National Urban Fellows.

References

External links
Honolulu Star-Bulletin (7 July 1999): Timing is Everything in Anzai Nomination
Honolulu Advertiser (5 February 2002): Attorney General's wife lobbied for airline merger

1941 births
Living people
Hawaii Attorneys General
Oregon State University alumni
William S. Richardson School of Law alumni
Hawaii politicians of Japanese descent
University of Hawaiʻi at Mānoa alumni